O'Sullivan Army Heliport  is a U.S. Army heliport at Camp San Luis Obispo in San Luis Obispo County, California, United States. It is located just off California State Route 1, northwest of the city of San Luis Obispo, about halfway between it and Morro Bay. O'Sullivan AHP has one helipad designated H1 with a 2,430 by 75 ft (741 by 23 m) asphalt surface.

References

External links 
 
 
 

United States Army airfields
Installations of the United States Army in California
Airports in San Luis Obispo County, California
Military heliports in the United States